Rusubbicari was a Phoenician and Carthaginian colony and Roman town. It has been tentatively identified with ruins at Zemmouri El Bahri, Algeria. The Roman town was in the province of Mauretania Caesariensis.

Name

The present name is a masculine plural noun, suggesting it may have originally consisted of two or three separate settlements. It seems to a latinization of a Phoenician name including the element rush ("cape") and a local Berber placename.

Religion
Rusubbicari was a Christian bishopric in late antiquity and is a Catholic titular see.

List of bishops

 At the 411 Carthage conference between Catholic baptists and Donatists of Roman Africa, the town was represented by the Donatist Costanzo as the diocese on that occasion had no Catholic bishops. 
Paolino participated in the synod assembled in Carthage in 484 by the Vandal King Huneric, after which Paolino was exiled.
José da Silva Chaves (November 29, 1967 – May 14, 1976 appointed bishop of Uruaç)
Victor León Esteban San Miguel y Erce (May 31, 1976 – April 4, 1995 deceased)
Douglas William Young (14 April 2000 – 17 July 2006 appointed Archbishop of Mount Hagen)
Sergio Osvaldo Buenanueva (July 16, 2008 – May 31, 2013 appointed bishop of San Francisco)
Jose Puthenveettil, since August 23, 2013
Today Rusubbicari survives as a titular bishopric holder; The current bishop is Jose Puthenveettil, auxiliary bishop of Ernakulam-Angamaly.

See also
Zemmouri

References

Citations

Bibliography
 .

Archaeological sites in Algeria
Catholic titular sees in Africa
Roman towns and cities in Mauretania Caesariensis
Ancient Berber cities
Phoenician colonies in Algeria